Fred Goldsmith (born March 3, 1944) is a former American football player and coach.  He served as the head football coach at Slippery Rock University of Pennsylvania (1981), Rice University (1989–1993), Duke University (1994–1998), and Lenoir–Rhyne University (2007–2010), compiling a career record of 59–104–1.

Coaching career
Goldsmith is perhaps best known for his head coaching stints at two NCAA Division I football programs: Rice and Duke.  He was recognized as the 1992 Sports Illustrated National NCAA Football Coach of the Year for leading Rice to within one win of a bowl game. The Owls finished 6-5 and tied for second in the Southwest Conference, their best showing in conference play in 28 years. However, a 61-32 rout at the hands of intercity rival Houston left them out of a bowl.

Primarily on the strength of turning the Rice program around, he was hired at Duke in 1994, where he won the Bobby Dodd Coach of the Year Award in his first season after leading the Blue Devils to their first winning season in six years, and only their eighth winning season in 30 years. However, this momentum did not last, and within two years the Blue Devils had crumbled to the second winless season in school history. Goldsmith was fired by Duke athletics director Joe Alleva just a year into Alleva's tenure after recording only nine wins during his last four seasons, including only three in Atlantic Coast Conference play.

In addition, under Goldsmith's tenure, Duke's football program was ordered to pay walk-on kicker, Heather Sue Mercer, $2,000,001 in nominal and punitive damages for its discriminatory treatment of her during her time on the team.  A federal jury found that Mercer was afforded less of an opportunity to practice and compete than other 'similarly situated' players (other walk-on kickers).  Her allegations also included sexist statements made to her by  Goldsmith. (See Mercer v. Duke University, 190 F.3d 643 (4th Cir. 1999).

Goldsmith's final coaching job was as the 18th head football coach for Lenoir–Rhyne University, an NCAA Division II school in Hickory, North Carolina.  Hired on November 28, 2006, Goldsmith arrived at Lenoir-Rhyne fresh off a successful four-year run at Franklin High School in Franklin, North Carolina, where he compiled an overall win–loss record of 47–15.  Goldsmith retired on May 3, 2011.

Head coaching record

College

References

1944 births
Living people
Air Force Falcons football coaches
Arkansas Razorbacks football coaches
Duke Blue Devils football coaches
Florida A&M Rattlers football coaches
High school football coaches in North Carolina
Lenoir–Rhyne Bears football coaches
Rice Owls football coaches
Slippery Rock football coaches
Western Carolina Catamounts football players
University of Florida alumni